Dacor is a former American manufacturer of scuba diving gear which was founded in 1953 by Sam Davison Jr. in Evanston, Illinois as "The Davison Corporation", from which Dacor was coined by using the initial syllables, "Da" and "cor".

Dacor was one of the five original United States diving gear makers:
 U.S. Divers: renamed as Aqua Lung America, which see.
 Healthways, now part of Johnson Outdoors.
 Voit
 Dacor:  Dacor merged with Mares. A Dacor open-circuit scuba named DaCor was patented by Dacor; e.g. see  (a safety float) in 1955 by Sam Jr, founder and president.   His brother, Donald Davison, was vice president and worldwide sales. After their deaths in the late 1980s, Sam's wife Joan became CEO of the company, and later sold to Mares.
 Swimaster: became part of Spearfisherman (company), which became part of Voit.

Star Wars sound designer Ben Burtt around 1977 used a Dacor scuba regulator to create the heavy breathing of the notorious antagonist Darth Vader.

References

External links 
 Dacor's current website
 Official Dacor website as it was on 1 August 2008.

Diving engineering
Diving equipment manufacturers